Abdollahabad (also Romanized as ‘Abdollāhābād) is a village in Ordughesh Rural District, Zeberkhan District, Nishapur County, Razavi Khorasan Province, Iran.

Population
At the 2006 census, its population was 998, in 266 families.

See also 

 List of cities, towns and villages in Razavi Khorasan Province

References 

Populated places in Nishapur County
Populated places in Iran